Jerry Weiss (born May 1, 1946 in New York City) is an American trumpet and flugelhorn player, best known as a founding member of the jazz fusion band Blood, Sweat & Tears. He appeared on their critically acclaimed 1968 debut album, Child Is Father to the Man.

Weiss left soon afterwards to help form the short-lived horn-band, Ambergris, where he played bass guitar and piano and was the principal arranger. He also contributed three songs on the album and co-wrote another. Weiss has made infrequent appearances on recordings by other artists, including Al Kooper, a fellow Blood, Sweat & Tears member.

References

External links
[ Jerry Weiss at AllMusicGuide.com]
Blood, Sweat & Tears band member information
Jimmy Maeulen
Charlie Camilleri
Tony May

1946 births
Living people
American trumpeters
American male trumpeters
Musicians from New York City
Blood, Sweat & Tears members
21st-century trumpeters
21st-century American male musicians